O Long Village is a village in Sai Kung District, Hong Kong.

External links
 Delineation of area of existing village O Long (Sai Kung) for election of resident representative (2019 to 2022)

Villages in Sai Kung District, Hong Kong